Tom Novy (born Thomas Reichold) is a DJ and producer from Munich, Germany.

Biography

Tom Novy lived in Munich in his youth and attended the Luitpold Gymnasium in Munich. In the mid-1980s he started to DJ and got his first residency at the Babalu Club. 

Novy started producing music in 1994 when he signed for the Munich-based record label Kosmo Records with his first record "I House U", a cover of the Jungle Brothers' "I'll House You", with lyrics by Novy. His original tracks ran more along the subgenre of European-flavoured progressive house. Since then, Novy has moved to a Chicago-style garage house sound, usually vocalized.

Tom Novy hosted various music-related TV shows on MTV Germany (including the shows Dance Floor Charts, Streetlife, Battle of DJ's and Nightlife) and VIVA.

Discography

Albums

Singles

Tom Novy

Novy vs. Eniac

Other aliases
2002 "The First The Last Eternity" (2002 Mixes), as Snap! vs. Tom Novy
2003 "@ Work", as Supermodel DJs (with Phil Fuldner)
2005 "I Need Your Lovin'", as Casanovy (with Adrian Misiewicz)
2006 "New Dimension", as Yvonn (with Adrian Bahil and Bill Brown)
2006 "The Power", as Tom Novy vs. TV Rock (with TV Rock)
2007 "Slap That Bitch", as Tom Novy vs. JCA (with Jean-Claude Ades, Patty the Downtownprincess and Simone Anés)
2008 "Rhythm Is a Dancer (2008)", as Novy vs. Snap!
2010 "Deep in My Soul", as Tom & Jerry feat. Loredana (with Jerry Ropero)
2011 "Take Me to the Top", as Tom & Jerry (with Jerry Ropero)

Remixes
2006 Roger Sanchez - Lost (Tom Novy's Lost In Space Remix / Tom Novy's Lost In Space Dub)
2006 Martijn ten Velden - I Wish U Would (Tom Novy Remix)
2008 FilterFunk - S.O.S. (Message In A Bottle) (Tom Novy Remix)
2009 Snap! - Exterminate
2011 Fragma - Toca's Miracle (Tom Novy & Jashari Deepdown Mix)

References

External links

Official site in German or English

1970 births
Living people
German electronic musicians
German DJs
German record producers
German house musicians
House musicians
Progressive house musicians
Electronic dance music DJs